Skene Manor, listed on the National Register of Historic Places as Judge Joseph Potter House, is a historic home located at Whitehall in Washington County, New York.  It was built in 1874 and is a handsome Victorian style mansion built of grey sandstone quarried from its own site with a mansard roof.  It features two towers and is embellished with three flat roofed bracketed porches.  The center tower is three and one half stories and once featured a large clock that has been removed.  The mansion was operated as a restaurant, but is now undergoing restorations and is open for tours.

References

External links
Skene Manor - Home
Skene Manor Castle

Houses on the National Register of Historic Places in New York (state)
Houses completed in 1874
Houses in Washington County, New York
Museums in Washington County, New York
Historic house museums in New York (state)
National Register of Historic Places in Washington County, New York